Reaster is a small village in Bower parish, Caithness Highland, Scotland.

Populated places in Caithness